Tash Ma Tash (1993–2011) ("No Big Deal" in English) was a popular Saudi Arabian satirical comedy that ran for 18 seasons and is considered one of the most successful television works in Saudi Arabia and the Arab world. The show followed a sketch comedy format. It aired on the Saudi State-owned television channel Saudi 1 for 13 seasons but in 2005 it was bought by MBC. New episodes ran exclusively during Ramadan right after sunset.  The United States Library of Congress requested some parts of the work to be placed in the library’s archive. The idea of the series started through the artists Abdullah Al Sadhan and Nasser Al Qasabi, and directed by Amer Al Hamoud. After the first two seasons, the trio separated to be the duo Abdullah Al Sadhan and Nasser Al-Qasabi, in cooperation with the director Abdul Khaleq AlGhanem.

Synopsis
The show consists of episodic comedy sketches that present social commentary on the Saudi society. Every episode has a new story and characters, though popular characters tend to re-appear in new storylines. Most episodes poke fun at the flaws of Saudi society while others show a tendency for dark comedy and melodrama. The show was one of the pioneers of self-criticism in the Saudi media, with the episodes often dealing with sensitive topics such as social aspects, culture, terrorism, marital relations, and religion.

The show satirizes regional social, cultural, and legal state found within Saudi Arabia.

Cast
Nasir Al-Gasabi
Abdullah Al-Sadhan
Fahd Al-Hayyan
Yousef Al-Jarrah
Bashir Ghoneim
Mohammed Al-assa
Habib Al-Habib
Rashid Al Shamrani
Ali Al-Mdfa
Khaled Sami
Khaled El Sayed
Fahad Olayan
Reem Abdullah

Set Locations

Reception
John R. Bradley, author of Saudi Arabia Exposed: Inside a Kingdom in Crisis, said that the show continues to run and receive high ratings because, in Saudi Arabia, people perceive comedy to be a good valve for frustrations for social, regional, and other issues.

The show has been a target for religious clergy after an episode aired which criticized the judges of the local courts (who are clergymen) of skipping work or leaving early, leaving paperwork and cases delayed.

One episode portrayed the difficulty for women to do basic things without a mahram (a legal male guardian). The two heroines of the episode were alone because the husband of one and brother of the other were in Paris for a few weeks. The women were harassed and flirted with in parks by young men, escorted out of shops and turned away from banks. They tried to regain freedom of movement by borrowing a senile grand father (a cure worse than the disease) and finally disguised the daughter of one and niece of the other as a little boy. Ultra-conservatives deemed this episode offensive to Islamic traditions. Many people considered this episode to be somewhat exaggerated but true.

The two stars of the show even received death threats from terrorists after the show aired an episode which attacked terrorism. Actors constantly receive death threats.

2011, the show got discontinued but it was announced that near late 2022, that a new season would be released for Ramadan.

Badria Al-Bishir details what she calls battles between the extremist (mutawa) and the liberals in Saudi Arabia. The show is considered a milestone in the critique of extremist thought in Saudi Arabia, which has been used to shape the public opinion. It rose in times when the Newspapers and TV production were dominated by the liberal party, while the educational systems were dominated by the religious party. The nature of the clash has often been explored in the Tash Ma Tash program.

References

1990s television sketch shows
2000s television sketch shows
2010s television sketch shows
1993 Saudi Arabian television series debuts
2011 Saudi Arabian television series endings
1990s Saudi Arabian television series
2000s Saudi Arabian television series
2010s Saudi Arabian television series
Middle East Broadcasting Center
1990s comedy television series
2000s comedy television series
2010s comedy television series
Saudi Arabian comedy television series